The 2010 Toledo Rockets football team represented the University of Toledo during the 2010 NCAA Division I FBS football season. The Rockets, led by second-year head coach Tim Beckman, compete in the West Division of the Mid-American Conference and played their home games at the Glass Bowl. They finished the season 8–5, 7–1 in MAC play and were invited to the Little Caesars Pizza Bowl where they were defeated by Sun Belt champion Florida International 32–34.

Schedule

References

Toledo
Toledo Rockets football seasons
Toledo Rockets football